Thới Bình may refer to several places in Vietnam, including:

Thới Bình District, a rural district of Cà Mau Province
Thới Bình, Cần Thơ, a ward of Ninh Kiều District
Thới Bình (township) a township and capital of Thới Bình District
Thới Bình (rural commune), a commune of Thới Bình District